Ladda simplicis is a species of butterfly in the family Hesperiidae. It is found in Colombia.

References

Butterflies described in 1991